"Employee Transfer" is the sixth episode of the fifth season of the American version of the television series The Office, and the show's seventy-eighth episode overall. It was broadcast in the United States on October 30, 2008 on NBC.

In this episode, Michael struggles with the fact that his girlfriend Holly is being transferred back to her old branch in Nashua, New Hampshire, after CFO David Wallace discovers their relationship. Meanwhile, Pam and Jim's two brothers play a prank on Jim, and Dwight irritates his romantic rival Andy by taking an interest in Andy's old school, Cornell University.

Synopsis
Pam Beesly (Jenna Fischer) is embarrassed when she is the only person at corporate wearing a costume on Halloween. Pam's costume is Charlie Chaplin and it cannot be removed since her mustache was applied with grease paint and removing the hat makes her look like Adolf Hitler. In Scranton, numerous employees dress in odd costumes, with Creed Bratton (Creed Bratton), Kevin Malone (Brian Baumgartner) and Dwight Schrute (Rainn Wilson) all dressing up as Heath Ledger's version of the Joker from 'The Dark Knight.' Jim Halpert's (John Krasinski) costume is minimalistic as usual, dressing up as a guy named "Dave" (a costume consisting of his normal attire, with a name tag).

Holly Flax (Amy Ryan) has been transferred back to her old branch in Nashua, New Hampshire after CFO David Wallace discovered her relationship with Michael Scott (Steve Carell). Michael and Darryl Philbin (Craig Robinson) help her move using Darryl's truck. Michael and Holly want to continue their relationship, but as they get closer to Nashua, Holly believes that their relationship is not going to work with the long distance. Michael begs her to keep their relationship alive as he fears he will go back to Jan Levinson. Michael had intended to spend the weekend with Holly before heading back to Scranton, but after they move her stuff into her new house, he changes his mind and heads back with Darryl. Michael and Holly share a last embrace before he leaves. In the truck, Darryl tries to console Michael by teaching him to sing the blues. Michael does not understand, but is cheered up nonetheless.

Jim meets Pam in New York for lunch with his brothers, Tom (Blake Robbins) and Pete (Tug Coker). Pam, Tom, and Pete arrive early to discuss a prank Pam wants to play on Jim that involves her engagement ring. Tom and Pete, however, think of playing a prank which detriments her interest in art. When Jim arrives, Tom and Pete begin mocking Pam's interest in art, and Jim continuously comes to her defense. When the argument becomes heated, Tom and Pete reveal it was a prank, and Jim and Pam stare awkwardly at each other. Later, when Jim and Pam are walking outside of the restaurant, Pam explains her original idea for the prank, which Jim appreciates much more than his brothers' idea. Moments later, Jim receives a text message from his brothers stating their approval of Pam and welcoming her to the family.

In Scranton, Dwight comes in wearing a Cornell sweatshirt, which irritates Andy Bernard (Ed Helms), who thinks Dwight is mocking him. Dwight tells him that he is going to apply to Cornell, and installs a Cornell pennant and a Cornell mascot bobblehead in his area. Dwight privately reveals to the camera that though he is indeed applying, he is only doing so to mock Andy, jealous of his engagement to Angela Martin (Angela Kinsey). In retaliation, Andy calls the university and is given permission to give Dwight his interview for admission. Andy has no intention of allowing Dwight to pass, and during the interview, Dwight notices inconsistencies with Andy's questions (such as asking who was Cornell's 8th president, which Dwight answers correctly as Dale R. Corson, but Andy replies with Cornell's 7th president James A. Perkins). He writes down critiques of Andy's interviewing skills, which he tells him he is going to send to the university. Dwight and Andy record numerous insults, culminating with Dwight saying he will apply to the "vastly superior Dartmouth". After a heated physical struggle with the conference room table, Andy gives up. The next day, Andy comes into the office in overalls, a farmer's hat, and a basket of beets, saying he is starting his own beet farm, in an attempt to mock Dwight. Dwight, however, is quick to point out Andy's lack of knowledge of beets.

Cultural references
Creed, Dwight and Kevin all dress in the style of Heath Ledger's performance as The Joker in the 2008 film, The Dark Knight. Creed Bratton (the actor) said of his costume, "I worked pretty hard to get him down. A lot of people said it was really eerie and kind of uncomfortable."

Reception
Holly's transfer to Nashua ranked number 4 in phillyBurbs.com's top ten moments from the fifth season of The Office. However, "Employee Transfer" was voted the fourth lowest-rated episode out of 26 from the fifth season, according to an episode poll at the fansite OfficeTally; the episode was rated 7.20 out of 10.

Reviews were mixed. Though CinemaBlend called the episode "weird" and the opening Halloween party "hilarious", it discussed at some length Holly and Michael's road trip with Darryl, which became a "painful breakup process" for the couple, with "poor Darryl" forced to listen to Michael begging not to break up.  IGN gave the episode a grade of 8.4 ("Great"), and described Steve Carell as adding "another dimension" to his character. Noting "a bunch of great moments" during the truck road trip, IGN singled out Darryl trying to teach Michael how to sing the blues as he "both laughs and cries" as taking "the prize" and "a pitch perfect moment and a beautiful scene". Adam Sweeney of Film School Rejects wrote, "The strength of the episode came, not surprisingly, in the road trip Michael, Holly, and Darryl (Craig Robinson) took to move Holly following her transfer. There is nothing more entertaining than a man that is desperate not to lose his girlfriend." But Sweeney concluded that it "may have been the weakest episode of season five".
In a later review in TheTVCritic.org, Robin Pierson wrote "Michael and Holly’s break-up is all too real and brings forth some excellent acting from both. Michael breaking down and crying and admitting that he will go back to Jan and that he hates her is particularly effective. Without any context his whiny voice might seem like overacting but it feels like the embodiment of Michael Scott and is very moving to hear."

References

External links
"Employee Transfer" at NBC.com

2008 American television episodes
Halloween television episodes
The Office (American season 5) episodes